Biner may refer to:

 Joseph Biner  (1697—1766), Swiss Roman Catholic canonist, historian and theologian
 Earnest Byner (born 1962), former American football running back in the National Football League

See also
 Carabiner